Ryan A. Court (born May 28, 1988) is an American former professional baseball infielder. He played in Major League Baseball (MLB) for one season for the Seattle Mariners.

Career

Arizona Diamondbacks
Court attended Dundee-Crown High School in Carpentersville, Illinois. He attended Illinois State University and played college baseball for the Redbirds. He was drafted by the Arizona Diamondbacks in the 23rd round of the 2011 MLB draft. 

Court played in the Diamondbacks organization from 2011 through 2014. During his time with them, he played for the Missoula Osprey, South Bend Silver Hawks, Visalia Rawhide, and Mobile BayBears. Court was released by Arizona on March 30, 2015.

Sioux City Explorers
He played for the Sioux City Explorers of the independent American Association for the 2015 season.

Boston Red Sox
Court signed a minor league contract with the Boston Red Sox on May 2, 2016. He played for the Portland Sea Dogs and the Pawtucket Red Sox during the 2016 season. Court spent the 2017 season with Pawtucket.

Chicago Cubs
Court elected free agency after the 2017 season, and signed a minor league contract with the Chicago Cubs. He played for the Iowa Cubs in 2018. Court was released by the Cubs on March 23, 2019.

Sugar Land Skeeters
He signed with the Sugar Land Skeeters of the independent Atlantic League.

Seattle Mariners
On May 7, the Seattle Mariners purchased his contract from Sugar Land and assigned him to the Tacoma Rainiers.

On July 26, 2019, the Mariners selected Court's contract and promoted him to the major leagues. He made his major league debut later that day pinch hitting in the bottom of the ninth inning against the Detroit Tigers. On August 9th Court hit his first home run against the Tampa Bay Rays in the 9th inning. Court was designated for assignment on September 10. He was outrighted to Tacoma on September 11. He became a free agent following the 2019 season.

Oakland Athletics
On January 28, 2020, Court signed a minor league deal with the Oakland Athletics. He became a free agent on November 2, 2020.

References

External links

Illinois State Redbirds bio

1988 births
Living people
Sportspeople from Elgin, Illinois
Baseball players from Illinois
Major League Baseball infielders
Seattle Mariners players
Illinois State Redbirds baseball players
Missoula Osprey players
South Bend Silver Hawks players
Visalia Rawhide players
Mobile BayBears players
Sioux City Explorers players
Portland Sea Dogs players
Pawtucket Red Sox players
Iowa Cubs players
Sugar Land Skeeters players
Everett AquaSox players
Tacoma Rainiers players
Leones del Escogido players
American expatriate baseball players in the Dominican Republic